was the seventeenth and final single by the Japanese band The Blue Hearts and reached #80 on the Oricon charts in 1993. It was part of the band's seventh album, Dug Out. The music and lyrics were written by Hiroto Kōmoto.

Details
The first B-side track is Sutegoma (すてごま Sacrifice) is a live version of the song recorded on Stick Out, the band's sixth album.

The second B-side track, Yoru no Tōzokudan (夜の盗賊団 Night Thieves), was written by Masatoshi Mashima.

References

The Blue Hearts songs
1993 singles
Songs written by Hiroto Kōmoto
1993 songs
East West Records singles